A list of films produced in the United Kingdom in 1955 (see 1955 in film):

1955

See also
 1955 in British music
 1955 in British television
 1955 in the United Kingdom

References

External links

1955
Films
Lists of 1955 films by country or language